The municipalities of El Salvador, called municipios, are 262 in total. Each one having its own capital and a variable number of cantons; these are conformed of caseríos.

The quantity of municipalities in each of the 14 departments of El Salvador is the following:

Ahuachapán Department 

 Ahuachapán
 Apaneca
 Atiquizaya
 Concepción de Ataco
 El Refugio
 Guaymango
 Jujutla
 San Francisco Menéndez
 San Lorenzo
 San Pedro Puxtla
 Tacuba
 Turín

Cabañas Department 

 Cinquera
 Dolores
 Guacotecti
 Ilobasco
 Jutiapa
 San Isidro
 Sensuntepeque
 Tejutepeque
 Victoria

Chalatenango Department 

 Agua Caliente
 Arcatao
 Azacualpa
 Chalatenango
 Citalá
 Comalapa
 Concepción Quezaltepeque
 Dulce Nombre de María
 El Carrizal
 El Paraíso
 La Laguna
 La Palma
 La Reina
 Las Vueltas
 Nombre de Jesús
 Nueva Concepción
 Nueva Trinidad
 Ojos de Agua
 Potonico
 San Antonio de la Cruz (San Antonio La Cruz)
 San Antonio Los Ranchos (San Antonio Ranchos)
 San Fernando
 San Francisco Lempa
 San Francisco Morazán
 San Ignacio
 San Isidro Labrador
 San José Cancasque
 San José Las Flores
 San Luis del Carmen
 San Miguel de Mercedes
 San Rafael
 Santa Rita
 Tejutla

Cuscatlán Department 

 Candelaria
 Cojutepeque
 El Carmen
 El Rosario
 Monte San Juan
 Oratorio de Concepción
 San Bartolomé Perulapía
 San Cristóbal
 San José Guayabal
 San Pedro Perulapán
 San Rafael Cedros
 San Ramón
 Santa Cruz Analquito
 Santa Cruz Michapa
 Suchitoto
 Tenancingo

La Libertad Department 

 Antiguo Cuscatlán
 Chiltiupán
 Ciudad Arce
 Colón
 Comasagua
 Huizúcar
 Jayaque
 Jicalapa
 La Libertad
 Nuevo Cuscatlán
 Opico
 Quezaltepeque
 Sacacoyo
 San José Villanueva
 San Matías
 San Pablo Tacachico
 Santa Tecla
 Talnique
 Tamanique
 Teotepeque
 Tepecoyo
 Zaragoza

La Paz Department 

 Cuyultitán
 El Rosario
 Jerusalén
 Mercedes La Ceiba
 Olocuilta
 Paraíso de Osorio
 San Antonio Masahuat
 San Emigdio
 San Francisco Chinameca
 San Juan Nonualco
 San Juan Talpa
 San Juan Tepezontes
 San Luis La Herradura
 San Luis Talpa
 San Miguel Tepezontes
 San Pedro Masahuat
 San Pedro Nonualco
 San Rafael Obrajuelo
 Santa María Ostuma
 Santiago Nonualco
 Tapalhuaca
 Zacatecoluca

La Unión Department 

 Anamorós
 Bolívar
 Concepción de Oriente
 Conchagua
 El Carmen
 El Sauce
 Intipucá
 La Unión
 Lislique
 Meanguera del Golfo
 Nueva Esparta
 Pasaquina
 Polorós
 San Alejo
 San José
 Santa Rosa de Lima
 Yayantique
 Yucuaiquín

Morazán Department 

 Arambala
 Cacaopera
 Chilanga
 Corinto
 Delicias de Concepción
 El Divisadero
 El Rosario
 Gualococti
 Guatajiagua
 Joateca
 Jocoaitique
 Jocoro
 Lolotiquillo
 Meanguera
 Osicala
 Perquín
 San Carlos
 San Fernando
 San Francisco Gotera
 San Isidro
 San Simón
 Sensembra
 Sociedad
 Torola
 Yamabal
 Yoloaiquín

San Miguel Department 

 Carolina
 Chapeltique
 Chinameca
 Chirilagua
 Ciudad Barrios
 Comacarán
 El Tránsito
 Lolotique
 Moncagua
 Nueva Guadalupe
 Nuevo Edén de San Juan
 Quelepa
 San Antonio
 San Gerardo
 San Jorge
 San Luis de la Reina
 San Miguel
 San Rafael (San Rafael Oriente)
 Sesori
 Uluazapa

San Salvador Department 

 Aguilares
 Apopa
 Ayutuxtepeque
 Cuscatancingo
 Delgado
 El Paisnal
 Guazapa
 Ilopango
 Mejicanos
 Nejapa
 Panchimalco
 Rosario de Mora
 San Marcos
 San Martín
 San Salvador
 Santiago Texacuangos
 Santo Tomás
 Soyapango
 Tonacatepeque

San Vicente Department 

 Apastepeque
 Guadalupe
 San Cayetano Istepeque
 San Esteban Catarina
 San Ildefonso
 San Lorenzo
 San Sebastián
 San Vicente
 Santa Clara
 Santo Domingo
 Tecoluca
 Tepetitán
 Verapaz

Santa Ana Department 

 Candelaria de la Frontera
 Chalchuapa
 Coatepeque
 El Congo
 El Porvenir
 Masahuat
 Metapán
 San Antonio Pajonal
 San Sebastián Salitrillo
 Santa Ana
 Santa Rosa Guachipilín
 Santiago de la Frontera
 Texistepeque

Sonsonate Department 

 Acajutla
 Armenia
 Caluco
 Cuisnahuat
 Izalco
 Juayúa
 Nahuizalco
 Nahulingo
 Salcoatitán
 San Antonio del Monte
 San Julián
 Santa Catarina Masahuat
 Santa Isabel Ishuatán
 Santo Domingo
 Sonsonate
 Sonzacate

Usulután Department 

 Alegría
 Berlín
 California
 Concepción Batres
 El Triunfo
 Ereguayquín
 Estanzuelas
 Jiquilisco
 Jucuapa
 Jucuarán
 Mercedes Umaña
 Nueva Granada
 Ozatlán
 Puerto El Triunfo
 San Agustín
 San Buenaventura
 San Dionisio
 San Francisco Javier
 Santa Elena
 Santa María
 Santiago de María
 Tecapán
 Usulután

See also 

 Departments of El Salvador
 Geography of El Salvador
 List of cities in El Salvador
 Ranked list of Salvadoran departments

References 

 
Subdivisions of El Salvador
Municipalities
Municipalities, El Salvador